Krzysztof Kajrys (born 20 September 1959) is a Polish footballer. He played in three matches for the Poland national football team in 1981.

References

External links
 

1959 births
Living people
Polish footballers
Poland international footballers
Place of birth missing (living people)
Association footballers not categorized by position